The Civil Aviation Department RG-1 Rohini is an Indian two-seat training sailplane of the 1960s.  A high-winged wooden monoplane, with side-by-side seating;at least 107 were built.

Development and design

The Technical Centre of the Indian Civil Aviation Department is its research and development arm, and started design and production of sailplanes in 1950.  In the early 1960s  S Ramamritham  designed a two-seat training sailplane, the RG-1 Rohini, the first of four prototypes flying on 10 May 1961. The Rohini is a  monoplane of wooden construction, with a braced high wing and a low mounted tail positioned forward of the fin.  Its crew of two sit side by side in an open cockpit, while the aircraft's undercarriage consists of a single  unsprung wheel under the fuselage, with skids under the nose and tail.

A total of 17 Rohinis were built by Veegal Engines and Engineering of Calcutta, with Hindustan Aeronautics Limited building a further 86 RG-1s by 1971.

Specifications (RG-1 Rohini)

See also

Notes

References

HAL aircraft
1960s Indian sailplanes
Civil Aviation Department aircraft
Aircraft first flown in 1961